Hadji Trendafila (1785-1845) was a Bulgarian school teacher.  She and her husband opened a school in Sliven in 1815, where he taught the boys and she the girls (she was herself educated in a convent). She was likely the first professional female teacher in Bulgaria.

References

1785 births
1845 deaths
19th-century Bulgarian women
19th-century Bulgarian educators